Gregg Michael Gillis (born October 26, 1981), known by the stage name Girl Talk, is an American disc jockey who specializes in mash-ups and digital sampling. Gillis has released five LPs on the record label Illegal Art and EPs on both 333 and 12 Apostles. He was trained as an engineer.

Early life and education
Gillis began experimenting with electronic music and sampling while a student at Chartiers Valley High School in the Pittsburgh, Pennsylvania suburb of Bridgeville. After a few collaborative efforts, he started the solo "Girl Talk" project while studying biomedical engineering at Case Western Reserve University in Cleveland, Ohio. In school, Gillis focused on tissue engineering.

Influences
Gillis states his musical inspirations to have been Squarepusher, Aphex Twin, Just Blaze, Nirvana and Kid606 among others. He has also stated interest in punk rock, as well as noise musician Merzbow. He stated that he was first introduced to the genre of Plunderphonics by John Oswald. Gillis has also stated that he was always into hip-hop and pop music. As he aged, he started to like older musicians such as The Beatles.

Career
Gillis worked as an engineer, but he quit in May 2007 to focus solely on music.

He produces mash-up remixes, in which he uses often a dozen or more unauthorized samples from different songs to create a mash-up. The New York Times Magazine has called his releases "a lawsuit waiting to happen", a criticism that Gillis has attributed to news media that want "to create controversy where it doesn't really exist", citing fair use as a legal backbone for his sampling practices.

Gillis has given his own different explanations for the origin of his stage name, once saying that it alluded to a Jim Morrison poem and once saying that it alluded to an early Merzbow side project. In 2009, he attributed the name to Tad, the early 1990s SubPop band, based in Seattle. Gillis has said the name sounded like a Disney music teen girl group.

In a 2009 interview with FMLY, Gillis stated:The name Girl Talk is a reference to many things, products, magazines, books. It's a pop culture phrase. The whole point of choosing the name early on was basically to just stir things up a little within the small scene I was operating from. I came from a more experimental background and there were some very overly serious, borderline academic type electronic musicians. I wanted to pick a name that they would be embarrassed to play with. You know Girl Talk sounded exactly the opposite of a man playing a laptop, so that's what I chose.

Gillis is featured heavily in the 2008 open source documentary RiP!: A Remix Manifesto.

Girl Talk released his fifth LP All Day on November 15, 2010 – free through the Illegal Art website. A U.S. tour in support of All Day began in Gillis's hometown of Pittsburgh with two sold-out shows at the then-recently completed Stage AE concert hall. Since Gillis releases his music under Creative Commons licenses, fans may legally use it in derivative works. Many create mash-up video collages using the samples' original music videos. Filmmaker Jacob Krupnick chose Gillis's full-length album All Day as the soundtrack for Girl Walk//All Day, an extended music video set in New York City.

In 2014, Girl Talk brought out Freeway as a special guest during a show at the Brooklyn Bowl. They announced that they were releasing a collaborative EP together called Broken Ankles. The project was released on April 8, 2014.

Gillis played at the Coachella Festival in 2014. For the first time in one of his live shows, artists performed their vocals over his mash-ups. During the first weekend, he was joined by Too Short, E-40, Juicy J, and Busta Rhymes. On the second weekend, he was joined by Freeway, Waka Flocka Flame, Tyga, and Busta Rhymes.

In the years following the release of Broken Ankles, Girl Talk continued to tour and play festivals. He also began to do more production and collaborative work with other artists such as Wiz Khalifa, Young Nudy, T-Pain, Smoke DZA, Bas, and G Perico.

Album pricing

After the success of his album Feed the Animals, for which listeners were asked to pay a price of their choosing, Gillis made all of his other albums similarly available via the Illegal Art website.

Awards
Night Ripper was number 34 on Pitchfork's Top 50 Albums of 2006, number 22 on Rolling Stone's Best Albums of 2006, and number 27 on Spin's 40 Best Albums of 2006. In 2007, Gillis was the recipient of a Wired magazine Rave Award.

Feed the Animals was number four on Time's Top 10 Albums of 2008. Rolling Stone gave the album four stars and ranked the album #24 on their Top 50 albums of 2008. Blender rated it the second-best recording/album of 2008, and National Public Radio listeners rated it the 16th best album of the year.

Gillis' hometown Pittsburgh, Pennsylvania, named December 7, 2010 "Gregg Gillis Day".

Film appearances
In 2007, Girl Talk appeared in Good Copy Bad Copy, a documentary about the current state of copyright law and remix culture.

In 2008, he appeared as a test case for fair use in Brett Gaylor's RiP!: A Remix Manifesto, a call to overhaul copyright laws. His parents, in one scene, complain to him about his frequent stripping during his performances.

Discography

Albums
 Secret Diary CD (2002, Illegal Art)
 Unstoppable CD (2004, Illegal Art)
 Night Ripper CD (2006, Illegal Art)
 Feed the Animals CD (2008, Illegal Art)
 All Day (2010, Illegal Art)

Collaborative albums
 Full Court Press (with Wiz Khalifa, Big K.R.I.T. and Smoke DZA) (2022, Asylum/Taylor Gang)

EPs
 Stop Cleveland Hate 12" (2004, 12 apostles)
 Bone Hard Zaggin' 7" (2006, 333 recordings)
 Broken Ankles (with Freeway) (2014, Girl Talk Music)

Compilation appearances
 bricolage #1 CD (Illegal Art) – "Killing a Material Girl"  – 3:37
 Illegal Art 2007 Sampler MP3 (Illegal Art) – "Let's Run This"
 Circuits of Steel CD (SSS) (2003) – "On Nesbit"
 Ministry of Shit CD (Spasticated) – "Let's Run This"
 Love and Circuits CD (Cardboard Records) – "All of the Other Songs Remixed" (under Trey Told 'Em)
 Circuits of Steel II CD (SSS) (2007) – "Andy Van Slyke Marijuana Sensitivity"

Singles
 "Tolerated" (with Freeway) [feat. Waka Flocka Flame] (2014)
 "Trouble In Paradise" (with Erick the Architect) (2018)
 "No Problem" (with Young Nudy) (2019)
 Smoke DZA - "Santos House Party" (feat. Wiz Khalifa, Curren$y, Big K.R.I.T., Girl Talk) (2020)
 "Fallin'" (with Bas) (2020)

Remixes
 Beck – "Cellphone's Dead" (2006) (unreleased)
 Peter Bjorn and John – "Let's Call It Off" (2006)
 Grizzly Bear – "Knife" (2007)
 Bonde do Role – "Gasolina" (2009)
 Bad Brilliance – "Non-Tradition (Girl Talk Remix)/It's So Fun (Andrew WK Remix)" (2009)
 Tokyo Police Club – "Cheer It On" (2007, under Trey Told 'Em)
 Simian Mobile Disco – "I Believe" (2007, under Trey Told 'Em)
 Professor Murder – "Dutch Hex" (2007, under Trey Told 'Em)
 Of Montreal – "Gronlandic Edit" (2007, under Trey Told 'Em) (unreleased)
 Thrill Jockey Records – "Super Epic Thrill Jockey Mega Massive Anniversary Mix" (2007, under Trey Told 'Em)
 Ke$ha – "Tik Tok" (2010, under Trey Told 'Em)

Production credits
Grand Buffet – "Cool as Hell" (2003) 
Jim Jones – "Believe in Magic" (feat. Lloyd) (2011)
Freeway – "Addiction" (2016) 
Freeway – "First Thing's First" (2016) 
Freeway – "Always Love You" (2016) 
Wiz Khalifa – "Steam Room" (feat. Chevy Woods) (2017)
Don Q - "Lil Bitch" (2017)
Smoke DZA – "The Hook Up" (feat. Dom Kennedy & Cozz) (2018) 
T-Pain - "Getcha Roll On" (feat. Tory Lanez) (2019) 
24hrs - "Bubble" (feat. Ty Dolla $ign) (2019)
Smoke DZA & Curren$y - "Cinderella Story" (2019)
Smoke DZA & Curren$y - "Boats and Hoes" (2019)
Cozz, Bas  – "Outta Pocket" (2020)
G Perico - "Toolie" (2020)

Live performances
Gillis began producing music with AudioMulch software, which he still uses, played live from a computer. During a live performance, he uses samples and loops to play a set — allowing room for variation throughout the set. His live sets are typically accompanied by video content on stage. He has been known to bring fans on stage to dance during performances.

References

External links
 
 2012 Article & Interview
 Girl Talk at Illegal Art

1981 births
American bioengineers
American electronic musicians
Case Western Reserve University alumni
Living people
Musicians from Pittsburgh
Remixers
American DJs
Engineers from Pennsylvania
Electronic dance music DJs
American mashup artists